Joseph J. Bingham Indianapolis Public School No. 84 is a historic elementary school building located at Indianapolis, Marion County, Indiana.  It was built in 1927–1928, and is a two-story, Mission Revival style building on a raised basement. It is of reinforced concrete construction sheathed in red brick with limestone detailing. It has a green clay barrel tile, side gabled roof.  A wing was added in 1955.

It was added to the National Register of Historic Places in 2004.

References

Elementary schools in Indiana
School buildings on the National Register of Historic Places in Indiana
Mission Revival architecture in Indiana
School buildings completed in 1928
Schools in Indianapolis
National Register of Historic Places in Indianapolis
1928 establishments in Indiana